John of Damascus (born Manṣūr ibn Sarjūn) or John Damascene was a Christian monk, priest, hymnographer, and apologist. Born and raised in Damascus c. 675 or 676; the precise date and place of his death is not known, though tradition places it at his monastery, Mar Saba, near Jerusalem on 4 December 749.

A polymath whose fields of interest and contribution included law, theology, philosophy, and music, he was given the by-name of Chrysorroas (Χρυσορρόας, literally "streaming with gold", i.e. "the golden speaker").
He wrote works expounding the Christian faith, and composed hymns which are still used both liturgically in Eastern Christian practice throughout the world as well as in western Lutheranism at Easter.

He is one of the Fathers of the Eastern Orthodox Church and is best known for his strong defence of icons. The Catholic Church regards him as a Doctor of the Church, often referred to as the Doctor of the Assumption due to his writings on the Assumption of Mary.
He was also a prominent exponent of perichoresis, and employed the concept as a technical term to describe both the interpenetration of the divine and human natures of Christ and the relationship between the hypostases of the Trinity. John is at the end of the Patristic period of dogmatic development, and his contribution less that of theological innovation than that of a summary of the developments of the centuries before him. In Catholic theology, he is therefore known as the "last of the Greek Fathers".

The main source of information for the life of John of Damascus is a work attributed to one John of Jerusalem, identified therein as the Patriarch of Jerusalem. This is an excerpted translation into Greek of an earlier Arabic text. The Arabic original contains a prologue not found in most other translations, and was written by an Arab monk, Michael, who explained that he decided to write his biography in 1084 because none was available in his day. However, the main Arabic text seems to have been written by an unknown earlier author sometime between the early 9th and late 10th century. 
Written from a hagiographical point of view and prone to exaggeration and some legendary details, it is not the best historical source for his life, but is widely reproduced and considered to contain elements of some value. The hagiographic novel Barlaam and Josaphat, is a work of the 10th century attributed to a monk named John. It was only considerably later that the tradition arose that this was John of Damascus, but most scholars no longer accept this attribution. Instead much evidence points to Euthymius of Athos, a Georgian who died in 1028.

Family background
John was born in Damascus, in 675 or 676, to a prominent Damascene Christian Arab family. 
His father, Sarjun ibn Mansur, served as an official of the early Umayyad Caliphate. His grandfather, Mansur ibn Sarjun, was a prominent Byzantine official of Damascus,  who had been responsible for the taxes of the region during the reign of Emperor Heraclius and also served under Emperor Maurice. 
Mansur seems to have played a role in the capitulation of Damascus to the troops of Khalid ibn al-Walid in 635 after securing favorable conditions of surrender. Eutychius, a 10th-century Melkite patriarch, mentions him as one high-ranking official involved in the surrender of the city to the Muslims.

The tribal background of Mansur ibn Sarjun, John's grandfather, is unknown, but biographer Daniel Sahas has speculated that the name Mansur could have implied descent from the Arab Christian tribes of Kalb or Taghlib. 
The name was common among Syrian Christians of Arab origins, and Eutychius noted that the governor of Damascus, who was likely Mansur ibn Sarjun, was an Arab. However, Sahas also asserts that the name does not necessarily imply an Arab background and could have been used by non-Arab, Semitic Syrians. While Sahas and biographers F. H. Chase and Andrew Louth assert that Mansūr was an Arabic name, Raymond le Coz asserts that the "family was without doubt of Syrian origin"; indeed, according to historian Daniel J. Janosik, "Both aspects could be true, for if his family ancestry were indeed Syrian, his grandfather [Mansur] could have been given an Arabic name when the Arabs took over the government." 
When Syria was conquered by the Muslim Arabs in the 630s, the court at Damascus retained its large complement of Christian civil servants, John's grandfather among them. John's father, Sarjun (Sergius), went on to serve the Umayyad caliphs. According to John of Jerusalem and some later versions of his life, after his father's death, John also served as an official to the caliphal court before leaving to become a monk. This claim, that John actually served in a Muslim court, has been questioned since he is never mentioned in Muslim sources, which however do refer to his father Sarjun (Sergius) as a secretary in the caliphal administration. In addition, John's own writings never refer to any experience in a Muslim court. It is believed that John became a monk at Mar Saba, and that he was ordained as a priest in 735.

Biography

John was raised in Damascus, and Arab Christian folklore holds that during his adolescence, John associated with the future Umayyad caliph Yazid I and the Taghlibi Christian court poet al-Akhtal.

One of the vitae describes his father's desire for him to "learn not only the books of the Muslims, but those of the Greeks as well." From this it has been suggested that John may have grown up bilingual. John does indeed show some knowledge of the Quran, which he criticizes harshly.

Other sources describe his education in Damascus as having been conducted in accordance with the principles of Hellenic education, termed "secular" by one source and "classical Christian" by another. One account identifies his tutor as a monk by the name of Cosmas, who had been kidnapped by Arabs from his home in Sicily, and for whom John's father paid a great price.

Under the instruction of Cosmas, who also taught John's orphan friend, Cosmas of Maiuma, John is said to have made great advances in music, astronomy and theology, soon rivalling Pythagoras in arithmetic and Euclid in geometry. 
As a refugee from Italy, Cosmas brought with him the scholarly traditions of Latin Christianity.

John   possibly had a career as a civil servant for the Caliph in Damascus before his ordination.

He then became a priest and monk at the Mar Saba monastery near Jerusalem. 
One source suggests John left Damascus to become a monk around 706, when al-Walid I increased the Islamicisation of the Caliphate's administration. 
This is uncertain, as Muslim sources only mention that his father Sarjun (Sergius) left the administration around this time, and fail to name John at all. 
During the next two decades, culminating in the Siege of Constantinople (717-718), the Umayyad Caliphate progressively occupied the borderlands of the Byzantine Empire. An editor of John's works, Father Le Quien, has shown that John was already a monk at Mar Saba before the dispute over iconoclasm, explained below.

In the early 8th century, iconoclasm, a movement opposed to the veneration of icons, gained acceptance in the Byzantine court. In 726, despite the protests of Germanus, Patriarch of Constantinople, Emperor Leo III (who had forced his predecessor, Theodosius III, to abdicate and himself assumed the throne in 717 immediately before the great siege) issued his first edict against the veneration of images and their exhibition in public places.

All agree that John of Damascus undertook a spirited defence of holy images in three separate publications. The earliest of these works, his Apologetic Treatises against those Decrying the Holy Images, secured his reputation. He not only attacked the Byzantine emperor, but adopted a simplified style that allowed the controversy to be followed by the common people, stirring rebellion among the iconoclasts. Decades after his death, John's writings would play an important role during the Second Council of Nicaea (787), which convened to settle the icon dispute.

John's biography recounts at least one episode deemed improbable or legendary. Leo III reportedly sent forged documents to the caliph which implicated John in a plot to attack Damascus. The caliph then ordered John's right hand be cut off and hung up in public view. Some days afterwards, John asked for the restitution of his hand, and prayed fervently to the Theotokos before her icon: thereupon, his hand is said to have been miraculously restored. In gratitude for this miraculous healing, he attached a silver hand to the icon, which thereafter became known as the "Three-handed", or Tricheirousa. That icon is now located in the Hilandar monastery of the Holy Mountain.

Veneration
When the name of John of Damascus was inserted in the General Roman Calendar in 1890, it was assigned to 27 March. The feast day was moved in 1969 to the day of John's death, 4 December, the day on which his feast day is celebrated also in the Byzantine Rite calendar, Lutheran Commemorations, and the Anglican Communion and Episcopal Church.

John of Damascus is honored in the Church of England and in the Episcopal Church on 4 December.

In 1890, he was declared a Doctor of the Church by Pope Leo XIII.

List of works

Besides his purely textual works, many of which are listed below, John of Damascus also composed hymns, perfecting the canon, a structured hymn form used in Byzantine Rite liturgies.

Early works
 Three Apologetic Treatises against those Decrying the Holy Images – These treatises were among his earliest expositions in response to the edict by the Byzantine Emperor Leo III, banning the veneration or exhibition of holy images.

Teachings and dogmatic works
 Fountain of Knowledge or The Fountain of Wisdom, is divided into three parts:
Philosophical Chapters (Kefálea filosofiká) – commonly called "Dialectic", it deals mostly with logic, its primary purpose being to prepare the reader for a better understanding of the rest of the book.
 Concerning Heresy (Perì eréseon) – the last chapter of this part (Chapter 101) deals with the Heresy of the Ishmaelites. Unlike earlier sections devoted to other heresies, which are disposed of succinctly in just a few lines, this chapter runs into several pages. It constitutes one of the first Christian refutations of Islam. One of the most dominant translations is his polemical work Peri haireseon translated from Greek into Latin. His manuscript is one of the first Orthodox Christian refutations of Islam which has influenced the Western Catholic Church's attitude. It was among the first sources representing the Prophet of Islam Muhammad to the West as "false prophet," and "Antichrist."
 An Exact Exposition of the Orthodox Faith (Ékdosis akribès tēs Orthodóxou Písteōs) – a summary of the dogmatic writings of the Early Church Fathers. This writing was the first work of systematic theology in Eastern Christianity and an important influence on later Scholastic works.
 Against the Jacobites
 Against the Nestorians
 Dialogue against the Manichees
 Elementary Introduction into Dogmas
 Letter on the Thrice-Holy Hymn
 On Right Thinking
 On the Faith, Against the Nestorians
 On the Two Wills in Christ (Against the Monothelites)
 Sacred Parallels (dubious)
 Octoechos (the church's liturgical book of eight tones)
 On Dragons and Ghosts

Teaching on Islam
As stated above, in the final chapter of Concerning Heresy, John mentions Islam as the Heresy of the Ishmaelites. He is one of the first known Christian critics of Islam. John claims that Muslims were once worshipers of Aphrodite who followed after Mohammad because of his "seeming show of piety," and that Mohammad himself read the Bible and, "likewise, it seems," spoke to an Arian monk that taught him Arianism instead of Christianity. John also claims to have read the Quran, or at least parts of it, as he criticizes the Quran for saying that the Virgin Mary was the sister of Moses and Aaron and that Jesus was not crucified but brought alive into heaven. John further claims to have spoken to Muslims about Mohammad. He uses the plural "we", whether in reference to himself, or to a group of Christians that he belonged to who spoke to the Muslims, or in reference to Christians in general.

Regardless, John claims that he asked the Muslims what witnesses can testify that Mohammad received the Quran from God – since, John says, Moses received the Torah from God in the presence of the Israelites, and since Islamic law mandates that a Muslim can only marry and do trade in the presence of witnesses – and what biblical prophets and verses foretold Mohammad's coming – since, John says, Jesus was foretold by the prophets and whole Old Testament. John claims that the Muslims answered that Mohammad received the Quran in his sleep. John claims that he jokingly answered, "You're spinning my dreams."

Some of the Muslims, John says, claimed that the Old Testament that Christians believe foretells Jesus' coming is misinterpreted, while other Muslims claimed that the Jews edited the Old Testament so as to deceive Christians (possibly into believing Jesus is God, but John does not say).

While recounting his alleged dialogue with Muslims, John claims that they have accused him of idol worship for venerating the Cross and worshipping Jesus. John claims that he told the Muslims that the black stone in Mecca was the head of a statue of Aphrodite. Moreover, he claims, the Muslims were wrong not to associate Jesus with God if Jesus is the Word of God. John claims that, if Jesus is the Word of God, and the Word of God has always existed with God, then the Word must be a part of God, and therefore be God himself, whereby, John says, it would be wrong for Muslims to call Jesus the Word of God but not God himself.

John ends the chapter quickly by claiming that Islam permits polygamy, that Mohammad committed adultery with a companion's wife before outlawing adultery, and that the Quran is filled with ridiculous stories, such as the She-Camel of God and God giving Jesus an "incorruptible table."

Arabic translation

It is believed that the homily on the Annunciation was the first work to be translated into Arabic. Much of this text is found in Manuscript 4226 of the Library of Strasbourg (France), dating to 885 AD.

Later in the 10th century, Antony, superior of the monastery of St. Simon (near Antioch) translated a corpus of John Damascene. In his introduction to John's work, Sylvestre patriarch of Antioch (1724–1766) said that Antony was monk at Saint Saba. This could be a misunderstanding of the title Superior of Saint Simon probably because Saint Simon's monastery was in ruins in the 18th century.

Most manuscripts give the text of the letter to Cosmas, the philosophical chapters, the theological chapters and five other small works.

In 1085, Mikhael, a monk from Antioch, wrote the Arabic life of the Chrysorrhoas. This work was first edited by Bacha in 1912 and then translated into many languages (German, Russian and English).

Modern English translations
 On holy images; followed by three sermons on the Assumption, translated by Mary H. Allies, (London: Thomas Baker, 1898)
 Exposition of the Orthodox faith, translated by the Reverend SDF Salmond, in Select Library of Nicene and Post-Nicene Fathers. 2nd Series vol 9. (Oxford: Parker, 1899) [reprint Grand Rapids, MI: Eerdmans, 1963.]
 Writings, translated by Frederic H. Chase. Fathers of the Church vol 37, (Washington, DC: Catholic University of America Press, 1958) [ET of The fount of knowledge; On heresies; The orthodox faith]
 Daniel J. Sahas (ed.), John of Damascus on Islam: The "Heresy of the Ishmaelites", (Leiden: Brill, 1972)
 On the divine images: the apologies against those who attack the divine images, translated by David Anderson, (New York: St. Vladimir's Seminary Press, 1980)
  Louth, who also wrote the introduction, was at the University of Durham as Professor of Patristics and Byzantine Studies.

Two translations exist of the 10th-century hagiographic novel Barlaam and Josaphat, traditionally attributed to John:
 Barlaam and Ioasaph, with an English translation by G.R. Woodward and H. Mattingly, (London: Heinemann, 1914)
 The precious pearl: the lives of Saints Barlaam and Ioasaph, notes and comments by Augoustinos N Kantiotes; preface, introduction, and new translation by Asterios Gerostergios, et al., (Belmont, MA: Institute for Byzantine and Modern Greek Studies, 1997)

See also

 Saint John of Damascus, patron saint archive

Notes

References

 Michiel Op de Coul en Marcel Poorthuis, 2011.

External links

131 Christians Everyone Should Know- John of Damascus
Catholic Encyclopedia: St. John Damascene
Britannica Concise Encyclopedia
Catholic Online Saints
Details of his work
; also available through the Internet Archive.
 
 
 
"St. John of Damascus' Critique of Islam" at the Orthodox Christian Information Center
Greek Opera Omnia by Migne, Patrologia Graeca with Analytical Indexes
St John of Damascus Orthodox Icon and Synaxarion (4 December)
Five Doctrinal Works is a 17th-century manuscript including three works by John of Damascus

676 births
749 deaths
7th-century Byzantine scientists
7th-century Byzantine writers
7th-century Christian theologians
7th-century composers
7th-century Arabs
8th-century Byzantine scientists
8th-century Byzantine writers
8th-century Christian saints
8th-century Christian theologians
8th-century composers
8th-century philosophers
8th-century Arabs
Saints
Byzantine composers
Byzantine philosophers
Byzantine hymnographers
Byzantine Iconoclasm
Byzantine saints
Byzantine theologians
Christian anti-Gnosticism
Christian apologists
Christian critics of Islam
Christians from the Umayyad Caliphate
Church Fathers
Doctors of the Church
Eastern Orthodox philosophers
Eastern Orthodox monks
Neoplatonists
People from Damascus
Syrian Christian saints
Systematic theologians
Anglican saints
Philokalia